La Prairie (previously known as Laprairie) is a federal electoral district in Quebec, Canada, that was represented in the House of Commons of Canada from 1867 to 1896, 1968 to 1997 and again since 2015.

History
The riding of Laprairie was created by the British North America Act of 1867. It consisted of the Parishes of Laprairie, Saint-Philippe, Saint Jacques le Mineur, Saint Isidore and Saint Constant, the Indian Lands of Sault Saint Louis, and all islands in the River Saint Lawrence close to the county. It was abolished in 1892 when it was redistributed into the Châteauguay and Laprairie—Napierville electoral districts.

The riding was re-created in 1966 from Beauharnois—Salaberry and Châteauguay—Huntingdon—Laprairie ridings. It consisted of:
 the City of Saint-Lambert;
 the Towns of Brossard, Candiac, Châteauguay, Châteauguay-Centre, Châteauguay Heights, Delson, Greenfield Park, La Prairie, LeMoyne, Léry and Préville; and
 in the County of Laprairie: the parish municipalities of Saint-Constant and Sainte-Catherine-d'Alexandrie-de-Laprairie; and the Indian Reserve of Caughnawaga No. 14.

In 1976, it was redefined to consist of:
 the City of Saint-Lambert;
 the Towns of Brossard, Candiac, Greenfield Park, La Prairie and LeMoyne; and
 in the county of Laprairie: the municipality of Notre-Dame.

In 1980, it was renamed La Prairie. In 1987, it was redefined to consist of the towns of Brossard, Candiac, La Prairie et Saint-Lambert.

The riding was abolished in 1996 when it was abolished into Brossard—La Prairie and Saint-Lambert. 

This riding was re-created during the 2012 electoral redistribution from parts of Châteauguay—Saint-Constant and Brossard—La Prairie.

Profile
The Bloc Québécois is more popular in the central and southern portions of the riding, in areas such as Saint-Constant, Sainte-Catherine, Delson and rural areas, with significant support in La Prairie. The Liberals are the main competitors to the Bloc, having won in 2015. Their support is concentrated in La Prairie and Candiac. The Mohawk reserve of Kahnawake is dominated by the Liberals and NDP, but turnout is generally low.

Members of Parliament
This riding has elected the following Members of Parliament:

Election results

La Prairie, 2015–present

La Prairie, 1980–1997

Laprairie, 1966–1980

Laprairie, 1867–1892

See also 

 List of Canadian federal electoral districts
 Past Canadian electoral districts

References

External links
Riding history from the Library of Parliament:
Laprairie 1867-1892
Laprairie 1966-1980
La Prairie 1980-1996

Quebec federal electoral districts
La Prairie, Quebec
Saint-Constant, Quebec
Roussillon Regional County Municipality